KNDN may refer to:

 KNDN (AM), a radio station (960 AM) licensed to serve Farmington, New Mexico, United States
 KNDN-FM, a radio station (97.5 FM) licensed to serve Shiprock, New Mexico